Emmanuel Vincent (2 October 1798 – 7 July 1860) was an English professional cricketer, who played first-class cricket from 1826 to 1837.

Born in Sheffield, Yorkshire, England, Vincent was a right-handed batsman and wicket-keeper, who was mainly associated with Sheffield, and made twenty known appearances in first-class matches.  He represented the North in the North v. South series.

Vincent died in Sheffield in July 1860.

References

External links

Further reading
 Arthur Haygarth, Scores & Biographies, Volume 2 (1827-1840), Lillywhite, 1862

1798 births
1860 deaths
English cricketers
English cricketers of 1826 to 1863
North v South cricketers
Cricketers from Sheffield
Nottingham Cricket Club cricketers
Sheffield Cricket Club cricketers